Conterno may refer to:

Giacomo Conterno, Italian wine producer of Piedmont
Poderi Aldo Conterno, Italian wine producer of Piedmont
Conterno Fantino, Italian wine producer of Piedmont

People with the surname
Angelo Conterno (1925–2007), Italian professional road racing cyclist
Giovanni Conterno (1929–2004), previous proprietor and winemaker of Giacomo Conterno
Roberto Conterno, modern era proprietor and winemaker of Giacomo Conterno

Italian-language surnames